The 1999 Masters (officially the 1999 Benson & Hedges Masters) was a professional non-ranking snooker tournament that took place between 7 and 14 February 1999 at the Wembley Conference Centre in London, England. The wild-card matches were extended from 9 to 11 frames.

John Higgins defeated Ken Doherty 10–8 in the final to win his first Masters title. He had also won the World title (where he also defeated Doherty) and UK title in 1998, meaning that at the time he held all three Triple Crown titles simultaneously. Before his semi-final match Higgins had said, referring to the possibility of holding all three titles, "That triple crown would be a dream but it's going to be tough." After his win, the term "Triple Crown" was used in a number of newspapers to describe Higgins' feat.

Field
Defending champion Mark Williams was the number 1 seed with World Champion John Higgins seeded 2. Places were allocated to the top 16 players in the world rankings. Players seeded 15 and 16 played in the wild-card round against the winner of the qualifying event, David Gray (ranked 61), and Jimmy White (ranked 18), who was the wild-card selection. David Gray and Mark King were making their debuts in the Masters.

Prize fund
The breakdown of prize money for this year is shown below:
Winner: £155,000
Runner-up: £80,000
Semi-finalist: £40,000
Quarter finalist: £26,000
Last 16: £15,000
Wild-card round: £9,000

High break Prize: £18,000
Maximum break: B&H Gold Award and a Honda car

Total:  £575,000

Wild-card round

In the preliminary round, the wild-card players plays the 15th and 16th seeds:

Main draw

Final

Qualifying
David Gray won the qualifying tournament, known as the 1998 Benson & Hedges Championship at the time.

Century breaks 
Total: 12
 123  Mark Williams
 121, 116, 113, 107, 105  Tony Drago
 115  James Wattana
 112, 104  John Higgins
 109, 104  Ken Doherty
 104  Alan McManus

James Wattana's century was scored in the wild-card round.

References

Masters (snooker)
Masters
Masters Snooker
February 1999 sports events in the United Kingdom